High Heat Major League Baseball 2002, also known as High Heat Baseball 2002, is a video game released in 2001, and is the fourth game in the High Heat Major League Baseball video game series. Then-Montreal Expos right fielder Vladimir Guerrero is featured on the cover. The game was released in March 2001 for Microsoft Windows, PlayStation, and PlayStation 2, followed by a Game Boy Advance port in September 2001. A Game Boy Color version was also in development but was cancelled.

Reception

The Windows and PlayStation 2 versions received "generally favorable reviews", while the Game Boy Advance and PlayStation versions received "mixed or average reviews", according to the review aggregation website Metacritic. Nintendo Power gave the Game Boy Advance version a favorable review, while GamePro gave the same handheld version a mixed review. Edge gave the Game Boy Advance version six out of ten, saying, "While US players can happily debate the pros and cons of team line-up, it's hard to see UK gamers making the same emotional link." Christopher Allen of AllGame gave the Windows version four stars out of five, stating, "With its massive number of statistics, solid gameplay, and avalanche of customization options, High Heat Major League Baseball 2002 is a must have for any baseball fanatic. A wide fan base and multiplayer options will insure the freshness of this title for a long time. Beyond the gnawing irritation of glaring bugs requiring a patch to swat, the game is the closest representation to baseball on the computer as of 2001." Tom Carroll of the same website gave the PlayStation 2 version three stars out of five, saying that it was "not a beautiful game, despite being one of the most complete baseball titles on the market today." Rob Smolka of Next Generation called the PlayStation 2 version "a must-buy for all serious PS2 baseball fans. Glenn Rubenstein of Extended Play gave the same console version three stars out of five and said that it was "by no means a poor title, it just lacks the polish and completeness of the other two titles [All-Star Baseball 2002 and Triple Play Baseball]."

Computer Games Magazine and PC Gamer US both named it the best sports game of 2001, with the latter calling it "the best simulation of any sport."

References

External links
 
 
 

2001 video games
Cancelled Game Boy Color games
Game Boy Advance games
Major League Baseball video games
PlayStation (console) games
PlayStation 2 games
Video games developed in the United States
Windows games